Kathryn Croft is a British author of psychological thriller fiction.  She sold one million novels within a year of publishing her third crime thriller.

Writing career
Croft is originally from Watford but grew up in Guildford. She was a secondary school teacher after gaining an MA in Media Arts with English Literature. She gave up teaching to focus on writing full-time. Her third novel – The Girl With No Past reached number 1 and stayed for over four weeks, in the Amazon Kindle chart.

Bibliography
 Behind Closed Doors - (Published by CreateSpace Independent Publishing Platform, December 2013)
 The Stranger Within - (Published by CreateSpace Independent Publishing Platform, October 2014)
 The Girl With No Past - (Published by Bookouture, October 2015)
 The Girl You Lost - (Published by Bookouture, February 2016)
 While You Were Sleeping - (Published by Bookouture, November 2016)
 Silent Lies - (Published by Bookouture, October 2017)
 The Warning - (Published by Bookouture, October 2018)
The Other Husband - (Published by Canelo, October 2021)

References

Living people
British crime fiction writers
People from Brierley Hill
Year of birth missing (living people)